The S50 is a railway service that runs every hour between  and  in the Swiss canton of Ticino and the Italian state of Lombardy, respectively. Treni Regionali Ticino Lombardia (TILO), a joint venture of Swiss Federal Railways and Trenord, operates the service.

Operations 

History 
The service did not operate on Sundays. The full reopening of the Mendrisio–Varese line on 7 January 2018 led to the extension of the S50 south to Varese and the increase of the frequency to hourly between Bellinzona and Varese. The S10 and S50 began operating as a single train between Bellinzona and Mendrisio. On 9 June 2019 the S50 and S40 swapped southern termini, with the S50 operating through to Malpensa Aeroporto and the S40 terminating at Varese.

The opening of the Ceneri Base Tunnel transformed regional services in Ticino. On 5 April 2021, the S50 and S10 began using the tunnel and bypassing all local stops between Giubiasco and Lugano. The northern terminus moved from Bellinzona to Biasca.

Notes

References

External links 
 
 Official site

Rail transport in Ticino
Transport in Lombardy